A Hatful of Music was a Canadian musical variety television series which aired on CBC Television in 1960.

Premise
The series was a mid-year substitute for The Joan Fairfax Show, presenting several styles of popular music including jazz, folk and Broadway. Ernie Prentice hosted the series, while Bob Switzer was its announcer. Ricky Hyslop directed the programme's band while Pat Trudell led the show's chorus.

Lorraine Foreman, Tommy Vickers with dancers Sherrill Morton, Peggy Rae Norman, and Mitch Hrushwy regularly performed on the series. Guests included Eleanor Collins, Dolores Claman, The Coronados, Phil Ford, The Four Lads, Tom Hill, Mimi Hines, Susan Johnston, Juliette, Jan Rubeš, Bud Spencer and Heather Thomson.

Production
The series was produced by Jim Winter in Vancouver and recorded before a live audience.

Scheduling
The half-hour series aired Sundays at 7:30 p.m. (Eastern).

References

External links
 

CBC Television original programming
1960 Canadian television series debuts
1960 Canadian television series endings
Television shows filmed in Vancouver